The Battle of Ratan was the last battle fought on Swedish soil during the Russian-Swedish War of 1808 - 1809. It took place a day apart from the Battle of Sävar, on 20 August 1809. Having conquered Finland from Sweden, the Russians had a small force in the northern areas of Sweden. The Swedes sought to eliminate this through a combined assault from land and sea, but the Russians moved more rapidly, defeating the Swedish force landed at Ratan at Sävar on 19 August. The next day, on 20 August, the Swedish force was attacked when evacuating from Ratan, but the artillery fire from Swedish warships kept the Russians at bay. Peace negotiations followed the heavy fighting.

Prelude to the battle 

The Russians had successfully captured the city of Umeå and driven the Swedish army commanded by Sandels south, to Härnösand. Tsar Alexander I of Russia demanded that Sweden cede all of Finland. To achieve a better negotiating position, the Swedish army command planned to land troops north of the Russian positions in Umeå to attack the Russian army from the rear, while the mainland army of 3,400 men under Fabian Wrede attacked them from the front.

Chosen to lead the sea-borne task force was Lieutenant-General Gustav Wachtmeister. Battle proven in the Prussian army, in the Russo-Swedish War 1789-1790, and in the Pomeranian War just two years earlier. There was talk on giving the command to von Döbeln, but Wachtmeister was chosen.

There was no threat from the Russians possible on the waters, as the combined force of the Swedish navy and the Royal Navy had the Russian fleet at bay. The task force left Stockholm on 8 August and sailed north towards Ratan 45 km north from Umeå. To avoid detection by the Russian army in Umeå, the task force sailed east of Holmön. It arrived at Ratan 16 August. The attack was planned for 19 August.

The Swedish task force sent was included the following vessels from both the navy and the archipelago fleet:
 2 ships of the line (Adolf Fredrik and Försiktigheten)
 1 frigate (Jarramas)
 44 gunboats and bomb vessels
 6 galleys
 20-40 troop transport ships
 6,800 soldiers

On 17 August the Swedish army disembarked from their ships in Ratan. Later the same day, they destroyed a small Russian detachment in Djäkneboda. The Russian commander, Lieutenant-General Nikolay Mikhailovich Kamensky, was marching south when he learned of the Swedish task force. He quickly wheeled around and marched north to face Wachtmeister's army before Wrede's arrived.

The Swedish force under Wachtmeister was delayed at Sävar 20 km north of Umeå. The Russians attacked Wachtmeister's force in Sävar at 07:30 on 19 August. The Russian force took possession of high ground immediately and the Swedes counterattacked the Russians uphill. A fierce battle broke out and despite Swedish success in the fighting, Wachtmeister ordered his forces to retreat back to Ratan. The Battle of Sävar was over at 15:00. Although the Battle of Sävar turned out as a Russian victory, the Russian army was too damaged to dare face Wrede advancing from the south.

At Sävar, Sweden suffered casualties of 396 men dead and around 450 wounded, the Russians suffered around 600 men dead and around 1000 wounded.

Description of the battle 
After the Battle of Sävar, the Swedish force fell back to the village of Ratan, in which they immediately prepared for another battle. On 20 August Kamensky ordered his army to attack the Swedes in a delaying battle to secure the Russian supply wagons' retreat north. This time Sweden had support from their artillery, not only the ground-based, but also the cannons loaded on the Swedish fleet. Altogether, around 100 cannons were available for the Swedish army. The artillery barrage destroyed large parts of the village and its surroundings.

During the Battle of Ratan, Wachtmeister managed to hold off Kamensky, who afterwards retreated north towards Piteå. Shortly after, Swedish troops entered Umeå.

Casualties at Ratan numbered 150 Swedes (26 dead, 2 prisoners) and 150 Russians (dead and wounded).

Aftermath 

Although the battle was a Russian victory, it was a pyrrhic one. The Russian army could not stay with the enemy advancing from the south having just suffered so many casualties. Instead it retreated north after the battle, easing the situation for the Swedish army. It has also been argued that the outcomes of the battles helped Sweden to achieve a better position in the peace negotiations with Russia. Czar Alexander of Russia had demanded all of Österland, Åland, the parts of Norrland in present-day Finland and parts of Norrland in present-day Sweden. The Czar's demand was for the border to be drawn at the Kalix River. The engagements in Sävar and Ratan have been argued to have helped move the border north to the Tornio and Muonio rivers in the peace talks.

Having the border further north than demanded by the Russians in the initial talks turned out to be fortunate for Sweden in the long run as major findings of iron ore were discovered in these areas later.

References

Ratan
Conflicts in 1809
1809 in Sweden
Ratan
Ratan
Västerbotten County
1809 in the Russian Empire
August 1809 events